A statue of Shinran is installed outside Tsukiji Hongan-ji in Tokyo, Japan.

External links

 

Buildings and structures in Chūō, Tokyo
Monuments and memorials in Japan
Outdoor sculptures in Tokyo
Sculptures of men in Japan
Shinran
Statues in Japan
Tsukiji